The Muir site, (15JS86), is an Early Fort Ancient culture archaeological site located in Jessamine County, Kentucky, in the Bluegrass region of the state. It was occupied from about 1010 to 1255 CE during the Osborne Phase of the local chronology. The site is near Jessamine Creek, on top of a broad ridge. Unlike later Fort Ancient villages, which are more compact, the Muir site structures were spread out over the ridge top. These structures were rectangular with single set post construction, as opposed to Mississippian style wall trench construction. Pottery found at the Muir site was limestone-tempered, unlike some later Fort Ancient pottery which became mussel shell tempered after contact with Mississippian cultures.

See also
 Cox site
 Thompson site

References

External links
 The Cox site in relation to the nearby Muir site
 ARCHAEOLOGICAL INVESTIGATIONS OF THE EARLY AND LATE FORT ANCIENT HOWARD SITE (15MA427), MADISON COUNTY, KENTUCKY

Fort Ancient culture
Archaeological sites in Kentucky
Geography of Jessamine County, Kentucky